The Zimbabwe cricket team toured Scotland in June 2017 to play two One Day International (ODI) matches. Both matches were played at The Grange Club, Edinburgh. It was the first bilateral series between the two teams. In the first match, Scotland beat Zimbabwe, recording their first win in an ODI against a Test playing nation. The series finished 1–1, with Zimbabwe winning the second match by 6 wickets.

Squads

ODI series

1st ODI

2nd ODI

References

External links
 Series home at ESPN Cricinfo

2017 in Scottish cricket
2017 in Zimbabwean cricket
International cricket competitions in 2017
Zimbabwean cricket tours abroad